Hye is a Korean given name and name element. Its meaning differs based on the hanja used to write it.

Hanja
There are 16 hanja with this reading on the South Korean government's official list of hanja which may be registered for use in given names; they are:

: to favour
: intelligent
: exclamation
: orchid
: broomstick
: intelligent
: to examine
: love
: twinkling star
: trail
: vinegar
: shoes
: intelligent
: sharp, pointed
: box
: honest words

People
People with the single-syllable name Hye include:
Hye of Baekje (died 599), 28th King of Baekje

As a name element
One name containing this element, Ji-hye, was a popular name for newborn girls in South Korean in the late 20th century, coming in 1st place in 1980 and 1990.

Names beginning with this element include:

Hye-bin
Hye-in
Hye-jin
Hye-jung
Hye-kyung
Hye-mi
Hye-rim
Hye-rin
Hye-su
Hye-sung
Hye-won
Hye-young

Names ending with this element include:

Eun-hye
In-hye
Ji-hye
Shin-hye

See also
List of Korean given names

References

Korean given names